Chip Pearson (born November 28, 1960) is an American politician who served in the Georgia State Senate from the 51st district from 2005 to 2011.

References

1960 births
Living people
Republican Party Georgia (U.S. state) state senators